Jimmy Arévalo (born 25 March 1960) is an Ecuadorian judoka. He competed at the 1980 Summer Olympics and the 1984 Summer Olympics.

References

External links
 

1960 births
Living people
Ecuadorian male judoka
Olympic judoka of Ecuador
Judoka at the 1980 Summer Olympics
Judoka at the 1984 Summer Olympics
Place of birth missing (living people)
20th-century Ecuadorian people